Witów  is a village in the administrative district of Gmina Lewin Kłodzki, within Kłodzko County, Lower Silesian Voivodeship, in south-western Poland.

The village has a population of 16.

References

Villages in Kłodzko County